JMWAVE or JM/WAVE or JM WAVE was the codename for a major secret United States covert operations and intelligence gathering station operated by the CIA from 1961 until 1968. It was headquartered in Building 25 at the former Naval Air Station Richmond, an airship base about 12 miles south of the main campus of the University of Miami on what is today the university's South Campus in Miami.  

The intelligence facility was also referred to as the CIA's "Miami Station" or "Wave Station."

History
JMWAVE underwent its first major development when it was established as the operations center for Task Force W, the CIA's unit dedicated to "Operation Mongoose," a U.S. effort to overthrow Fidel Castro's Communist government in Cuba. JMWAVE was also active in some form during the failed U.S.-sponsored "Bay of Pigs" invasion of Cuba in April 1961. The JMWAVE operation grew out of an earlier fledgling CIA office in Coral Gables.

The station's activities reached their peak in late 1962 and early 1963 around the Cuban Missile Crisis. Under Ted Shackley's leadership from 1962 to 1965, JMWAVE grew to be the largest CIA station in the world outside of the organization's headquarters in Langley, Virginia, with 300 to 400 professional operatives (possibly including about 100 based in Cuba) as well as an estimated 15,000 anti-Castro Cuban exiles on its payroll. The CIA was one of Miami's largest employers during this period.  Exiles were trained in commando tactics, espionage and seamanship and the station supported numerous exile raids on Cuba.

The main front company for JMWAVE was "Zenith Technical Enterprises, Inc." In addition, about 300 to 400 other front companies were created throughout South Florida with a large range of "safe houses", cover businesses and other properties. With an annual budget of approx. US$50 million (in 1960s dollars; US$50 million in 1962 dollars are worth US$403 million in 2017 dollars (PPP)), the station had a major impact on the economy of South Florida, creating a local economic boom - particularly in the real estate, banking and  certain manufacturing sectors. It also operated a fleet of aircraft and boats - this has been described as the third largest navy in the Caribbean at the time after the main US and Cuban navies. JMWAVE's activities were so widespread that they became an open secret amongst local Florida government and law enforcement agencies.

On June 26, 1964, Look magazine published an exposé by David Wise and Thomas B. Ross which revealed that Zenith was a CIA front. University of Miami authorities denied knowledge of the CIA operation (though Shackley would claim privately that University President Henry King Stanford was fully aware) and JMWAVE changed its main front company name from Zenith to "Melmar Corporation".

By 1968, JMWAVE was increasingly regarded as obsolete. There was also concern that the station would become a public embarrassment to the University of Miami. Consequently, it was deactivated and replaced with a substantially smaller station at Miami Beach.

As of 2004, the facilities on the Richmond Naval Air Station site were still used by several US government agencies, including the CIA's Foreign Broadcast Information Service, the United States Air Force and the United States Army. Several original JMWAVE buildings were still standing. As of 2007, Building 25 has been the subject of a local government effort to convert it into a military museum and memorial.

See also
Alleged role of former senior JMWAVE officers in the assassination of Robert F. Kennedy

References

Central Intelligence Agency operations
Cuba–United States relations
History of Miami
Opposition to Fidel Castro
University of Miami